Luke Alvez is a fictional character on the CBS crime drama Criminal Minds, portrayed by Adam Rodríguez.

Background and characterization 
Alvez was born in the Bronx, New York. Inspired by his father's military service, he joined the U.S. Army and served as a part of the 75th Rangers Regiment in Iraq, as he told Emily Prentiss (Paget Brewster). After he was discharged, Alvez joined the FBI and worked in several different divisions before being assigned to its Fugitive Task Force, where he became responsible for capturing fugitives on the run. While training with the Task Force, he studied Calvin Shaw (Harold Perrineau), a disgraced former FBI agent convicted of murdering his confidential informant. Later, one of Alvez's targets is a man named Daniel Cullen (Kraig Dane), a.k.a. "The Crimson King". During the manhunt, the Fugitive Task Force team can't get a positive identification on Cullen during his crimes, so Alvez's partner Phil Brooks (Corey Reynolds) goes undercover to lure him out. The operation is a success, and Cullen is recaptured, but not before he tortures Brooks. The incident had traumatized Alvez ever since.

Alvez has a dog named Roxy. Because of the affectionate way he talks about her in the office, Penelope Garcia (Kirsten Vangsness) thinks at first she is his human girlfriend.

Character arc 
In the Season 12 premiere he works with the BAU to catch the "Crimson King", one of the escapees who attacked his old partner. The team discovers that the real killer is Peter Lewis (Bodhi Elfman), aka "Mr. Scratch", who taunts the team by turning over the real "Crimson King", whom Lewis tortured to the point he no longer remembered who he is. After that Alvez decides to join the BAU full-time.

Following the tragic events of Season's 12 finale titled "Red Light", in the Season 13 premiere titled "Wheels Up", Alvez appears to be the only team member who is unharmed after a car crash Lewis caused. He is also the one who comforts Garcia, as she was the one to discover that Supervisory Special Agent Stephen Walker (Damon Gupton) had died in the crash. When the team discovers where Lewis is hiding, Alvez, Prentiss, Spencer Reid (Matthew Gray Gubler) and Matt Simmons (Daniel Henney) get to the location first. Alvez chases Lewis to the rooftop of the building, but Lewis falls to his death.

In the sixth episode of Season 14, titled "Luke", four people living in various cities along the East Coast are tortured and murdered over a three-day span, and the BAU is called in to connect the spree to a DEA-Federal Police manhunt for an infamous Mexican cartel hit man. Alvez becomes emotionally involved in the investigation of the case, because of his time spend as an undercover agent on the DEA a few years before. The case becomes personal when the killer, Jeremy Grant (Johnny Messner), murders Brooks and goes after his girlfriend Lisa Douglas (Daniella Alonso). For that reason, Prentiss takes him out of the case and tells him to go home. Alvez ignores Prentiss' orders, however, and helps the BAU team catch Grant. After this Lisa threatens to break up with him, but because he shows no toxic masculinity he tells her how he feels and she stays. 
In the 5th episode of season 15, “Ghost”, Alvez and Simmons are kidnapped. They outsmart their kidnappers and are saved by the team.
In the series finale, “And In the End”, it is revealed that Alvez and Lisa broke up. Later, at Penelope’s going-away party, Alvez asks her if she would like to go to dinner with him.

References

External links 
 Adam Rodriguez on IMDb
 Criminal Minds on IMDb
 Luke Alvez: List of Criminal Minds characters

Criminal Minds characters
Fictional Federal Bureau of Investigation personnel
Television characters introduced in 2016
Male characters in television
Fictional characters from New York City
American male characters in television